Curling at the 2007 Asian Winter Games was held at the Changchun Municipal Skating Rink in Changchun, China from 29 January to 1 February 2007.

South Korea won the gold medal in both men and women events.

Schedule

Medalists

Medal table

Participating nations
A total of 40 athletes from 4 nations competed in curling at the 2007 Asian Winter Games:

References

External links
Official website

 
2007 Asian Winter Games events
Asian Winter Games
2007